Ehrenfeld is a borough (Stadtbezirk) of the City of Cologne in Germany. It includes the seven quarters Bickendorf, Bocklemünd, Mengenich, Ehrenfeld, Neuehrenfeld, Ossendorf and Vogelsang. It has about 109,500 inhabitants (as of December 2020) and covers an area of 23.98 square kilometres. The district borders with the Cologne districts of Chorweiler to the North, Nippes and Innenstadt to the East and Lindenthal to the South-West.

Ehrenfeld is characterized by lively and popular residential areas and shopping streets, the media center "Coloneum" with the most modern production and movie studios and a large and vivacious free cultural scene with many artists' studios, theatres and clubs.

The landmark of Ehrenfeld is the Helios-lighthouse and the old factory of the perfume manufacturer 4711.

History 
Ehrenfeld got its name from the quarter Ehrenfeld, which represents the center of the borough. Ehrenfeld grew substantially during the Gründerzeit boom, became a municipality in 1867 and a town in 1879. Nine years later, Ehrenfeld became part of the city of Cologne. During summer and autumn of 1944 an anti-Nazi resistance group, known as the Ehrenfeld Group, operated from Ehrenfeld.

Subdivisions 
Ehrenfeld consists of six Stadtteile (city parts):

Transportation 

The borough is connected to the city centre of Cologne by numerous light rail stations of Cologne Stadtbahn line 3, 4, 5 and 13. The Bundesautobahn 57 connects Ehrenfeld with the Cologne Beltway, Venloer Straße is the district's principal road leading onto the Cologne Ring. The Köln-Ehrenfeld station (Bahnhof Ehrenfeld) connects the borough to the regional rail network.

References

External links 

 Official webpage of the district 

 
Boroughs and quarters of Cologne